Diego Llorico (born July 20, 1971), known mononymously as Diego, is a Filipino actor, segment producer and comedian. He is known for his appearances on the comedy films Boy Pick-Up: The Movie (2012) and D' Kilabots Pogi Brothers Weh?! (2012), and the television comedy sketch gag show Bubble Gang.

Filmography

Television

Movies

References

External links

Living people
People from Pasay
Male actors from Metro Manila
Filipino male television actors
GMA Network (company) people
GMA Network personalities
1971 births
Filipino male film actors
Gay comedians
Filipino gay actors
Filipino LGBT entertainers
Filipino male comedians
21st-century LGBT people